Ibón de Bachimaña Alto and Ibón de Bachimaña Bajo are glacial lakes in the Tena Valley in the Province of Huesca, northeastern Spain, near the border with France.

It is currently separated from the larger Ibón de Bachimaña Alto by a dam and is used as a reservoir.

References

Bachimana Alto
Geography of the Province of Huesca
Bachimana Alto
Bachimana Alto